TRNA dimethylallyltransferase (tRNA prenyltransferase, MiaA, transfer ribonucleate isopentenyltransferase, Delta2-isopentenyl pyrophosphate:tRNA-Delta2-isopentenyl transferase, Delta2-isopentenyl pyrophosphate:transfer ribonucleic acid Delta2-isopentenyltransferase) is an enzyme with systematic name dimethylallyl-diphosphate: tRNA dimethylallyltransferase. This enzyme catalyses the following chemical reaction

 dimethylallyl diphosphate + tRNA  diphosphate + tRNA containing 6-dimethylallyladenosine

Formerly known as tRNA isopentenyltransferase (EC 2.5.1.8), but it is now known that dimethylallyl diphosphate, rather than isopentenyl diphosphate, is the substrate.

Structural studies 
As of late 2007, only one structure has been solved for this class of enzymes, with the PDB accession code .

References

Literature

External links 

EC 2.5.1
Enzymes of known structure